Kevin Masterson is a fictional character appearing in American comic books published by Marvel Comics. The character was first introduced as a supporting character in Thor and appeared again in the spin-off series Thunderstrike, as the son of Eric Masterson, the featured character of both series. Kevin Masterson was later re-introduced in the Marvel Comics 2 series A-Next, as the superhero Thunderstrike, a theme which would be revisited in the Heroic Age of Marvel Comics in the eponymous limited series.

Publication history
Kevin Masterson was created by Tom DeFalco and Ron Frenz, first appearing in Thor vol. 1 #392 in June 1988 as the son of the original hero known as Thunderstrike, Eric Masterson. He would continue to appear in a supporting role in Thor and spin-off series Thunderstrike.

The character would be re-imagined in What If vol. 2 #105, appearing for the first time as a new version of Thunderstrike. An origin for Kevin Masterson as Thunderstrike would appear in the follow-up MC2 series A-Next #1, where he would continue to be featured, as part of the ensemble cast of characters. He would also appear in the MC2 series Last Hero Standing and sequel Last Planet Standing; as well as, the follow-up series Avengers Next.

The use of Kevin Masterson as a legacy version of Thunderstrike was a theme revisited during the Heroic Age. It was announced that the character would return in a new five-issue miniseries by co-creators Tom DeFalco and Ron Frenz in November 2010. Promotionals leading into the event began in August depicting the mace stating "One will rise..." and "The World Still Needs Heroes."  The first issues received generally positive reviews, lauding the premise, characterization and plotting. By series end the book was praised for plotting, dialogue, and characterization, with the contemporization of a classic character into timeless.

Thunderstrike appeared in Fear Itself: The Home Front.

He is currently a member of the Asgardians of the Galaxy.

Fictional character biography

MC2
Kevin Masterson is granted the mace of his deceased father by Edwin Jarvis, the Avengers' butler, per his father's will. The mace is stolen from Kevin and even comes into the possession of Loki, who had created a spell to tap the dormant power within the mace. Kevin leaps into the midst of the spell, absorbing the mace and the magic it contains. He becomes his own version of Thunderstrike and a founding member of a new version of the Avengers.

As the series continues, Thunderstrike's biggest challenge comes when the Avengers travel to a dark parallel dimension, where he encounters a dark version of his father. The alternate Eric Masterson recognized Thunderstrike as Kevin, who learns that in this reality, he, not Eric, has died. The alternate Eric and Kevin bonded, and once the Avengers defeat the dark dimension's ruler, Kevin stays behind to be with his "father".

Kevin returns to his home reality, and rejoins the Avengers to aid in the battle with Seth. When Galactus destroys Asgard, Thunderstrike seemingly loses his powers in Last Planet Standing. He is kidnapped by Ulik and Sylene, daughter of Loki, as part of a plan to restore Asgard; but Kevin Masterson struggles against his captors. Ultimately he is responsible for turning the tables on the villains. Thena, daughter of Thor, who had also taken part in the battle against her cousin, is able to restore Kevin's power, allowing him to become Thunderstrike once again.

Thunderstrike (limited series)
An embittered adolescent Kevin Masterson is featured in the Thunderstrike limited series. The character previously featured as an idealistic child is shown to have anger, behavioral problems, and disillusioned outlook on "spandex-covered glory hounds."

He is given his father's enchanted mace by Captain Steve Rogers; which to their mutual disappointment triggers no change in the character (although he does receive an open invitation to the Avengers Academy, in which he is later seen arriving on their New Campus in California.).

While on his way home, Kevin tries to save a mother and child from a rampaging Rhino and is transformed into a superhero. Kevin briefly battles the Rhino, and shortly after Kevin is defeated, he realizes that he is in his father's body. Mangog, a foe of Thor, resurfaces and threatens New York City. The young hero teams with Thor, to battle the monster. Kevin accepts his new identity as Thunderstrike, along with a new image, and continues his adventures under the mentorship of Brunnhilde the Valkyrie.

During the Fear Itself storyline, Thunderstrike ends up teleported onto a station in the middle of the Pacific Ocean with Amadeus Cho, X-23, Spider-Girl, and Power Man. They end up fighting a bunch of samurai Shark Men.

Kevin briefly appeared as part of the new class of students when the Avengers Academy moves to the former headquarters of the West Coast Avengers.

Powers and abilities

MC2
Kevin has the ability to change from his normal form into the superhuman Thunderstrike. As Thunderstrike, he has the powers contained within the mace of the same name. Thunderstrike is superhumanly strong and durable. He can generate explosive bursts of sonic force (his "thunderbolts") from his hands, and direct them as blasts of force, or focus the energy into his fists to deliver super-strong punches. Thunderstrike can direct his blasts downwards to launch himself into the air and, while he cannot fly, can propel himself to great distances. He even learned how to modulate the frequency of his sonic energies to shatter objects just by touching them, without harming nearby people.

Thunderstrike (limited series)
Kevin's demonstrated powers in the limited series are the same as his father's, including the reversion to his normal state if he is separated from Thunderstrike for over sixty seconds. He did not use the ability to fire energy blasts from the mace in the limited series. Thanks to tutoring by the valkyrie Brunnehilde, he is also capable of changing his appearance as Thunderstrike, finally choosing a form which is a modified version of his normal self.

Collected editions

References

External links
 Thunderstrike (Kevin Masterson) at Marvel Wiki
 

Characters created by Tom DeFalco
Characters created by Ron Frenz
Comics characters introduced in 1988
Fictional characters from parallel universes
Marvel Comics 2
Marvel Comics superheroes
Marvel Comics characters who can move at superhuman speeds
Marvel Comics characters who use magic
Marvel Comics characters with accelerated healing
Marvel Comics characters with superhuman strength